The Hamilton Hurricanes are a junior Canadian football team based in Hamilton, Ontario. Founded in 1963, the team competes in the Ontario Football Conference of the Canadian Junior Football League.

History
The original Hurricanes team was founded in 1963 and won eight provincial titles and one Leader Post Trophy as national champions. The team folded in 1994 due to financial difficulties but returned for the 2008 season.

References

Canadian Junior Football League teams
Sports teams in Hamilton, Ontario
1963 establishments in Ontario
Sports clubs established in 1963